Chupovo is a rural locality (a village) in Kichmegnskoye Rural Settlement, Kichmengsko-Gorodetsky District, Vologda Oblast, Russia. The population was 25 as of 2002.

Geography 
Chupovo is located 12 km southeast of Kichmengsky Gorodok (the district's administrative centre) by road. Chupovo is the nearest rural locality.

References 

Rural localities in Kichmengsko-Gorodetsky District